William E. Hawkins (September 23, 1863 – July 23, 1937) was a justice of the Supreme Court of Texas from January 1913 to January 1921.

References

Justices of the Texas Supreme Court
1863 births
1937 deaths